The National Business Book Award is an award presented to Canadian business authors. The award, presented every year since 1985, is sponsored by Bennett Jones, The Globe and Mail, and The Walrus, DeGroote, and supported by CPA Canada and with prize management by Freedman & Associates.

Among the jury members is jury chairman Peter Mansbridge, former Chief Correspondent for the Canadian Broadcasting Corporation's CBC News.  Also on the jury are David F. Denison, Chairman of Hydro One, business journalist Deirdre McMurdy, author and publisher Anna Porter, and Pamela Wallin, a Conservative sitting in the Senate of Canada.

Winners
 2019: Chris Clearfield and András Tilcsik, Meltdown: Why Our Systems Fail and What We Can Do About It (Allen Lane, imprint of Penguin Random House, 2018)
2018: Chris Turner, The Patch: The People, Pipelines and Politics of the Oil Sands (Simon & Schuster, 2017)
2017: Daniel J. Levitin,  A Field Guide to Lies: Critical Thinking in the Information Age (Allen Lane, imprint of Penguin Random House, 2016)
 2016: Jacquie McNish and Sean Silcoff, Losing the Signal: The Spectacular Rise and Fall of Blackberry (HarperCollins Publishers, 2015)
 2015: Alfred Hermida, Tell Everyone: Why We Share and Why it Matters (Doubleday Canada, imprint of Penguin Random House, 2014)
 2014: Jim Leech and Jacquie McNish, The Third Rail: Confronting Our Pension Failures (Signal, imprint of McLelland & Stewart, 2013)
 2013: Chrystia Freeland, Plutocrats: The Rise of the New Global Super-Rich and the Fall of Everyone Else (Doubleday Canada, 2012)
 2012 : Bruce Philp, Consumer Republic: Using Brands to Get What You Want, Make Corporations Behave, and Maybe Even Save the World (McLelland & Stewart, 2011)
 2011 : Ezra Levant, Ethical Oil: The Case for Canada's Oil Sands (McLelland & Stewart, 2010)
 2010 : Jeff Rubin, Why Your World Is About to Get a Whole Lot Smaller: Oil and the End of Globalization (Random House, 2009)
 2009 : Gordon Pitts, Stampede! The Rise of the West and Canada's New Power Elite (Key Porter Books, 2008)
 2008 : William Marsden, Stupid to the Last Drop: How Alberta Is Bringing Environmental Armageddon to Canada (And Doesn't Seem to Care) (Knopf Canada, 2007)
 2007 : Thomas Homer-Dixon, The Upside of Down: Catastrophe, Creativity, and the Renewal of Civilization (Island Press, 2006)
 2006 : Matthew Bellamy, Profiting the Crown: Canada's Polymer Corporation, 1942-1990 (McGill-Queen's University Press, 2004)
 2005 : Jacquie McNish and Sinclair Stewart, Wrong Way: The Fall of Conrad Black (Overlook Hardcover, 2004)
 2004 : Kim Vicente, The Human Factor: Revolutionizing the Way People Live With Technology (Routledge, 2004)
 2003 : Douglas Hunter, The Bubble and The Bear: How Nortel Burst the Canadian Dream (Doubleday Canada, 2002)
 2002 : John Lawrence Reynolds, Free Rider (McArthur & Company Publishing, 2001)
 2001 : Naomi Klein, No Logo: Taking Aim at the Brand Bullies (Knopf Canada, 2000)
 2000 : Ingeborg Boyens, Unnatural Harvest: How Genetic Engineering is Altering Our Food (Doubleday Canada, 2000)
 1999 : Jennifer Wells, Fever: The Dark Mystery of the Bre-X Gold Rush (Viking, 1998)
 1998 : Anthony Bianco, The Reichmanns - Family, Faith, Fortune, and the Empire of Olympia and York (Random House, 1998)
 1997 : Rod McQueen, Who Killed Confederation Life?: The Inside Story (McClelland & Stewart, 1996)
 1996 : Heather Robertson, Driving Force: The McLaughlin Family and the Age of the Car (McClelland & Stewart, 1995)
 1995 :  Anne Kingston, The Edible Man: Dave Nichol, President's Choice and the Making of Popular Taste (Macfarlane Walter & Ross, 1995)
 1994 : Duncan McDowall, Quick to the Frontier: Canada's Royal Bank (McClelland & Stewart, 1993)
 1993 : Peter Foster, Self-Serve: How Petro-Canada Pumped Canadians Dry (Macfarlane Walter & Ross, 1992)
 1992 : G. Bruce Doern and Brian W. Tomlin, Faith and Fear: The Free Trade Story (Stoddart, 1991)
 1991 : Ann Gibbon and Peter Hadekel, Steinberg: The Breakup of a Family Empire (Macmillan of Canada, 1990)
 1990 : Ian Brown, Freewheeling: the Feuds, Broods, and Outrageous Fortunes of the Billes Family and Canada's Favorite Company (HarperCollins Canada, 1989)
 1989 : Greig Steward, Shutting Down the National Dream (McGraw-Hill Ryerson, 1988, 
 1988 : Michael Bliss, Northern Enterprise: Five Centuries of Canadian Business (McClelland & Stewart, 1990)
 1987 : Philip Smith, Harvest from the Rock: A History of Mining in Ontario (Macmillan of Canada, 1986)
 1986 : Ann Shortell and Patricia Best, A Matter of Trust (Penguin Books, 1986)

References

External links
 Official website

Canadian non-fiction literary awards
Awards established in 1985
1985 establishments in Canada